Frederick Howe was an English professional footballer who played as a wing half in the Football League for Coventry City and Brentford.

Career statistics

References

1895 births
English footballers
English Football League players
Brentford F.C. players
Date of death missing
Coventry City F.C. players
Footballers from Rotherham
Peterborough & Fletton United F.C. players
Southern Football League players
Wellingborough Town F.C. players
Association football wing halves

Kimberworth Old Boys F.C. players